Georgia became a U.S. state in 1788, which allowed it to send  congressional delegations to the United States Senate and United States House of Representatives beginning with the 1st United States Congress in 1789. Each state elects two senators to serve for six years, and members of the House to two-year terms.

These are tables of congressional delegations from Georgia to the United States Senate and the United States House of Representatives.

Current delegation 

Georgia's current congressional delegation in the  consists of its two senators, both of whom are Democrats, and its 14 representatives: 9 Republicans and 5 Democrats.

United States Senate

United States House of Representatives

1789–1793: 3 districts 
In the inaugural U.S. Congress, Georgia was apportioned 3 seats as per Article I of the U.S. constitution. Georgia elected the members district wise.

1793–1827: at-large seats 
Following 1790 census, Georgia was apportioned two seats. Following 1800 census, Georgia was apportioned four seats, then 6 seats following 1810 census, and seven seats following 1820 census. From 1793 to 1827 all such seats were elected at-large statewide on a general ticket.

1827–1829: 7 districts 
In 1827, Georgia's seven seats were redistricted into seven districts.

1829–1845: at-large seats 
In 1829, Georgia eliminated the districts and all seats were elected at-large statewide on a general ticket. Following 1830 census, Georgia was apportioned nine seats and following the 1840 census eight seats.

1845–1863: 8 districts 
In 1845, Georgia's eight seats were redistricted into eight districts.

1863–1873: 7 districts 
Following 1860 census, Georgia was apportioned seven seats.

1873–1883: 9 districts 
Following 1870 census, Georgia was apportioned nine seats.

1883–1893: 10 districts 
Following 1880 census, Georgia was apportioned 10 seats. The tenth seat was elected at-large statewide in 1883. From 1885, all 10 seats were redistricted.

1893–1913: 11 districts 
Following 1890 census, Georgia was apportioned 11 seats.

1913–1933: 12 districts 
Following 1910 census, Georgia was apportioned 12 seats.

1933–1993: 10 districts 
Following 1930 census, Georgia was apportioned 10 seats.

1993–2003: 11 districts 
Following 1990 census, Georgia was apportioned 11 seats.

2003–2013: 13 districts 
Following 2000 census, Georgia was apportioned 13 seats.

2013–present: 14 districts 
Following 2010 census, Georgia was apportioned 14 seats.

Key

See also

List of United States congressional districts
Georgia's congressional districts
Political party strength in Georgia

Notes

References 

 
 
Georgia
Politics of Georgia (U.S. state)
Congressional delegations